Maswar District is a district of the 'Amran Governorate, Yemen. As of 2003, the district had a population of 38,432 inhabitants. In the early 20th century, the mountain village was visited by German explorer and photographer, Hermann Burchardt.

References

Districts of 'Amran Governorate
Maswar District